The Frank Newman Speller Award is an annual award for significant contributions to corrosion engineering and is administered by NACE International. (The organization was previously known as the National Association of Corrosion Engineers.) The award is named in honor of Frank Newman Speller, a Canadian-born American metallurgical engineer notable for his pioneering text on corrosion.

Recipients
Source: NACE International

1947 - Frank Newman Speller
1948 - John M. Pearson
1949 - Francis L. LaQue
1950 - O.C. Mudd
1951 - Kirk H. Logan
1952 - Starr Thayer
1953 - Scott P. Ewing
1954 - E.H. Dix, Jr.
1955 - Gordon N. Scott
1956 - Mars G. Fontana
1957 - Walter F. Rogers
1958 - Robert J. Kuhn
1959 - A. Wachter
1960 - J.C. Hudson
1961 - K.G. Compton
1962 - C.P. Larrabee
1963 - Thomas P. May
1964 - Hugh P. Godard
1965 - F.W. Wink
1966 - Richard S. Treseder
1967 - John D. Sudbury
1968 - Lee P. Sudrabin
1969 - Charles G. Munger
1970 - Arland W. Peabody
1971 - Andrew Dravnieks
1972 - No recipient	
1973 - Fred M. Reinhart
1974 - K.N. Barnard
1975 - Bernard Husock	
1976 - E.H. Phelps
1977 - Walter K. Boyd
1978 - Joseph B. Cotton	
1979 - M.C. Miller
1980 - H. Spahn
1981 - J.H. Morgan
1982 - Richard F. Stratful
1983 - Ernest W. Haycock
1984 - Warren E. Berry
1985 - Stanley L. Lopata
1986 - R.N. Miller
1987 - Einar Mattsson 
1988 - Robert A. Baboian
1989 - A.J. Sedricks
1990 - M.E. Indig
1991 - Sheldon W. Dean
1993 - Bryan E. Wilde
1994 - S. Evans
1995 - P.R. Rhodes
1996 - Peter L. Andresen 
1997 - Jacques-Philippe Berge
1998 - H. Okada
1999 - Herbert E. Townsend
2000 - Peter M. Scott
2001 - G. Schick
2002 - G.M. Gordon
2003 - R.W. Schutz
2004 - Boris A. Miksic
2005 - D. Knotkova-Cermakova	
2006 - Masakatsu Ueda
2007 - Jorge A. González
2008 - David C. Silverman
2009 - Bruce Hinton
2010 - Andrew Garner
2011 - Pierre Combrade
2012 - William Hartt
2013 - John Beavers
2014 - Shunichi Suzuki
2015 - Jeffrey Gorman
2016 - David Shifler
2017 - Narasi Sridhar
2018 - Robert Tapping
2019 - U. Kamachi Mudali
2020 - Roy Johnsen

See also

 List of engineering awards

External links
 Frank Newman Speller Award

Chemical engineering awards
Corrosion prevention